Boland is a first-class cricket team that nominally represents the Boland region, in the South African province of Western Cape, in the CSA Provincial Competitions. The team is selected and supported by the Boland Cricket Board (BCB) and plays its home games at Boland Park in Paarl. At organisational level, the BCB is responsible for the administration and development of cricket in the region and among its primary functions are management and promotion of the Boland team. The current BCB was founded in 1992 as a merger between the Boland Cricket Union and an earlier Boland Cricket Board.

Honours
 Standard Bank Cup (1) – 1999–2000

Team history
Boland began playing in first-class matches in October 1980. They began in the lower (B-province) level of the first-class competitions but were raised to A-province status in 1994. To take part in the SuperSport Series, the Boland side merged with Western Province to form Western Province Boland (now Cape Cobras) from October 2004. Since 2004, Boland have competed in the CSA Provincial Competitions. As of late November 2022, they have played 348 first-class matches with 82 wins, 143 losses, 120 draws and three ties. 

Among South African international players who have played for Boland have been the 2007 national player of the year, pace bowler Charl Langeveldt, who was with the Boland team throughout his domestic career from 1997 to 2013, and the all-rounder Justin Ontong played for Boland for nearly twenty years to 2017.

Venues
Venues used for Boland matches have included: 
 Oude Libertas, Stellenbosch Farmers Winery Ground, Stellenbosch (October 1980 – February 1991)
 Brackenfell Sports Fields (September 1989 – January 1995)
 Callie de Wet Sportsground, Robertson (used once in September 1990)
 Boland Park, Worcester (October 1990 – September 1993)
 Bredasdorp Cricket Club Ground (used once in September 1992)
 Stellenbosch University Ground, Coetzenburg (October 1993 – February 1999; used earlier by SA Universities in 1978)
 Paarl Cricket Club Ground (November 1994 – February 1995)
 Boland Park, Paarl (main venue from December 1994)

Squad
In April 2021, Cricket South Africa confirmed the following squad ahead of the 2021–22 season.

 Janneman Malan
 Pieter Malan
 Hardus Viljoen
 Is-maeel Gafieldien
 Ferisco Adams
 Siyabonga Mahima
 Christiaan Jonker
 Ruan Terblanche
 Imraan Manack
 Shaun von Berg
 Mickey Copeland
 Zakhele Qwabe
 Clyde Fortuin
 Achille Cloete
 Stiaan van Zyl
 Ziyaad Abrahams
 Kyle Abbott

Players

References

Sources
 South African Cricket Annual – various editions
 Wisden Cricketers' Almanack – various editions

South African first-class cricket teams
Cricket in the Western Cape